A kyaung is a monastery (vihara), comprising the domestic quarters and workplaces of Buddhist monks. Burmese kyaungs are sometimes also occupied by novice monks (samanera), lay attendants (kappiya), nuns (thilashin), and young acolytes observing the five precepts ( phothudaw). 

The kyaung has traditionally been the center of village life in Burma, serving as both the educational institution for children and a community center, especially for merit-making activities such as construction of buildings, offering of food to monks and celebration of Buddhist festivals, and observance of uposatha. Monasteries are not established by members of the sangha, but by laypersons who donate land or money to support the establishment.

Kyaungs are typically built of wood, meaning that few historical monasteries built before the 1800s are extant. Kyaungs exist in Myanmar (Burma), as well as in neighboring countries with Theravada Buddhist communities, including neighboring China (e.g., Dehong Dai and Jingpo Autonomous Prefecture). According to 2016 statistics published by the State Sangha Maha Nayaka Committee, Myanmar is home to 62,649 kyaungs and 4,106 nunneries.

Usage and etymology 
The modern Burmese language term kyaung descends from the Old Burmese word kloṅ (က္လောင်). The strong connection between religion and schooling is reflected by fact that the kyaung is the same word now used to refer to secular schools. Kyaung is also used to describe Christian churches, Hindu temples, and Chinese temples. Mosques are an exception, as they use the term word bali, which is derived from the Tamil word for 'school.'

Kyaung has also been borrowed into Tai languages, including into Shan as kyong (spelt ၵျွင်း or ၵျေႃင်း) and into Tai Nuea as zông2 (ᥓᥩᥒᥰ, rendered in Chinese as ).

Types 
The Burmese-Pali commentaries of Cullavagga identify five types of Buddhist monasteries, each typified by distinct architectural features. In practice, from an architectural standpoint, there are 3 main types of monasteries:

 Monasteries with contiguous roofs, 
 Monasteries with cross-shaped roofs, and 
 Staging monasteries and staging halls

In modern-day Myanmar, kyaungs may be divided into a number of categories, including monastic colleges called sathintaik and remote forest monasteries called tawya kyaung. Myanmar's primary monastic university towns are Bago, Pakokku, and Sagaing.

History 
In pre-colonial times, the kyaung served as the primary source of education, providing nearly universal education for boys, representing the "bastion of civilization and knowledge" and "integral to the social fabric of pre-colonial Burma." The connections between kyaungs and education were reinforced by monastic examinations, which were first instituted in 1648 by King Thalun during the Taungoo Dynasty. Classical learning was transmitted through monasteries, which served as venues for Burmese students to pursue higher education and further social advancement in the royal administration after disrobing. Indeed, nearly all prominent historical figures such as Kinwun Mingyi U Kaung spent their formative years studying at monasteries.

Traditional monastic education first developed in the Pagan Kingdom, in tandem with the proliferation of Theravada Buddhism learning in the 1100s. The syllabus at kyaungs included the Burmese language, Pali grammar and Buddhist texts with a focus on discipline, morality and code of conduct (such as Mangala Sutta, Sigalovada Sutta, Dhammapada, and Jataka tales), prayers and elementary arithmetic. Influential monasteries held vast libraries of manuscripts and texts.  The ubiquity of monastic education was attributed with the high literacy rate for Burmese Buddhist men. The 1901 Census of India found that 60.3% of Burmese Buddhist men over twenty were literate, as compared to 10% for British India as a whole.

Kyaungs called pwe kyaungs (ပွဲကျောင်း) also taught secular subjects, such as astronomy, astrology, medicine, massage, divination, horsemanship, swordsmanship, archery, arts and crafts, boxing, wrestling, music and dancing. During the Konbaung Dynasty, various kings, including Bodawpaya suppressed the proliferation of pwe kyaung, which were seen as potential venues for rebellions.

Sumptuary law dictated the construction and ornamentation of  Burmese kyaungs, which were among the few building structures in pre-colonial Burma to possess elaborate multi-tiered roofs called pyatthat. Mason balustrades characterized royal monasteries.

Following the abolishment of the Burmese monarchy at the end of the Third Anglo-Burmese War, monastic schools were largely superseded by secular, government-run schools.

Common kyaung features 

The typical kyaung consists of a number of buildings called kyaung zaung (ကျောင်းဆောင်):
 Thein (from Pali ) - ordination hall as prescribed by the Vinaya
 Dhammayon - assembly hall used for sermons and communal purposes
 Zedi (စေတီ, from Pali cetiya) - stupa, often covered with gold leaf and containing a reliquary
 Gandhakuti (ဂန္ဓကုဋိ, from Pali ) - pavilion that houses the monastery's principal image of the Buddha
 Shrines to the arhats Sīvali and Shin Upagutta
 Tagundaing - ornamented flagstaff celebrating the submission of local nats (animistic spirits) to the Dhamma
 Zayat - open-air pavilions used as rest houses
 Living quarters for the monks and the sayadaw
 Kyetthayei khan (ကျက်သရေခန်း) - storage room
 Cooking quarters

Traditional monasteries of the Konbaung era consisted of the following halls:
Pyatthat hsaung - main chapel hall that housed images of the Buddha
Hsaungmagyi or hsaungma - main assembly hall for lectures, ceremonies and housing junior monks
Sanu hsaung - residential hall of the monastery abbot
Bawga hsaung - storage room for monks' provisions

In pre-colonial times, royal monasteries were organized as complexes known as kyaung taik (ကျောင်းတိုက်), composed of several residential buildings, including the main building, the kyaunggyi (ကျောင်းကြီး) or kyaungma (ကျောင်းမ), which was occupied by the residing sayadaw, and smaller structures called kyaungyan (ကျောင်းရံ), which housed the sayadaw's disciples. The complexes were walled compounds, and also housed a library, ordination halls, meeting halls, water reservoirs and wells, and utility buildings. Thayettaw is a major kyaungtaik in downtown Yangon, comprising over 60 individual monasteries.

Examples
Atumashi Monastery
Bagaya Monastery
Htilin Monastery
Mahagandhayon Monastery
Myadaung Monastery
Salin Monastery
Shweinbin Monastery
Shwenandaw Monastery
Shwezedi Monastery
Taiktaw Monastery
Yaw Mingyi Monastery
Kongmu Kham, Arunachal Pradesh, India
Foguang Temple, Yunnan, China
Dhammikarama Burmese Temple, Penang, Malaysia
Burmese Buddhist Temple, Singapore

See also
 Gautama Buddha
 Dhamma
 Sangha
 Three Refuges
 Five Precepts
 Eight Precepts
 Four Noble Truths
 Noble Eightfold Path
 Pāli Canon
 Mangala Sutta
 Samatha & Vipassanā
 Cetiya
 Sri Maha Bodhi
 Vassa
 Kathina
 Uposatha
 Shinbyu
 Gadaw
 Shwedagon Pagoda
 Thadingyut Festival
 Pagoda festival
 Pagodas in Myanmar
 Agga Maha Pandita
 State Sangha Maha Nayaka Committee
 List of Sāsana Azani recipients
 International Theravada Buddhist Missionary University
 State Pariyatti Sasana University, Yangon
 State Pariyatti Sasana University, Mandalay
 Buddha Sāsana Nuggaha
 Young Men's Buddhist Association (Burma)
 Vihara
 Wat

References

Buddhist monasteries
Buddhism in Myanmar

Buddhist buildings